Senthilkumar M is an Indian politician. He is a member of the All India Anna Dravida Munnetra Kazhagam party. He was elected as a member of Tamil Nadu Legislative Assembly from Kallakurichi Constituency in May 2021.

Electoral performance

References 

Living people
Year of birth missing (living people)
People from Tamil Nadu
Tamil Nadu politicians
All India Anna Dravida Munnetra Kazhagam politicians
Tamil Nadu MLAs 2021–2026